Marie Abts-Ermens (10 April 1767 in Kortenberg – 11 September 1853 in Brussels) was a Belgian seamstress, best remembered for sewing together the first version of the Flag of Belgium on 26 August 1830.

References 

1767 births
1853 deaths
Belgian designers
People from Kortenberg